The Co-operative Women's Guild was an auxiliary organisation of the co-operative movement in the United Kingdom which promoted women in co-operative structures and provided social and other services to its members.

History

The guild was founded in 1883 by Alice Acland, who edited the "Women's Corner" of the Co-operative News, and Mary Lawrenson, a teacher who suggested the creation of an organization to promote instructional and recreational classes for mothers and girls. Acland began organizing a Women's League for the Spread of Co-operation which held its first formal meeting of 50 women at the 1883 Co-operative Congress in Edinburgh and established local branches. It began as an organization dedicated to spreading the co-operative movement, but soon expanded beyond the retail-based focus of the movement to organizing political campaigns on women's issues including health and suffrage. Annie Williams, a suffragette organiser for the Women's Social and Political Union in Newcastle found in 1910 that 'Co-operative women are very keen to know about 'Votes for Women'.

In 1884 the league changed its name to the Women's Co-operative Guild and later to the Co-operative Women's Guild.  In 1899, Margaret Llewelyn Davies was elected general secretary of the Guild and was widely credited with greatly increasing the success of the Guild. By 1910 it had 32,000 members. Maternity benefits were included in the National Insurance Act 1911 because of the guild's pressure. The guild became more politically active, and expanded its work beyond the British Isles; their objectives included the establishment of minimum wages and maternity benefits, and in April 1914 they were involved in an International Women's Congress at The Hague which passed a resolution totally opposing war:

this Conference is of opinion that the terrible method of war should never again be used to settle disputes between nations, and urge that a partnership of nations, with peace as its object, should be established and enforced by the people's will.

After World War I the guild became more involved in peace activism, concentrating especially on the social and political conditions that encouraged or gave rise to war, as well as opposition to the arms trade. In 1933 they introduced the White Poppy as a pacifist alternative to the British Legion's annual red poppy appeal. At this time membership of the guild was at its peak, with 1,500 branches and 72,000 members.

The guild continued with several local branches, although it did not have the visibility within the co-operative movement it once did.  It closed after 133 years on 25 June 2016.

General secretaries
1883: Alice Acland
1885: Mary Lawrenson
1889: Margaret Llewelyn Davies
1922: Honora Enfield
1927: Eleanor Barton
1937: Rose Simpson
1940: Cecily Cook
1953: Mabel Ridealgh
1963: Kathleen Kempton
1983: Diane Paskin
Sue Bell
2005: Claire Morgan
2011: Colette Harber

References

External links

Centenary history
CWG Archive at the National Co-operative Archive
CWG Archive at the Bishopsgate Institute
CWG Archive at LSE Archives

1883 establishments in the United Kingdom
 
Organizations established in 1883
Organizations disestablished in 2016
Political advocacy groups in the United Kingdom
Victorian era
Women's organisations based in the United Kingdom